The Diocese of Manzini is a Latin Church ecclesiastical territory or diocese of the Catholic Church in Eswatini. It is a suffragan diocese in the ecclesiastical province of the metropolitan Johannesburg in South Africa. Its episcopal see is located in the city of Manzini.

History
 April 19, 1923: Established as Apostolic Prefecture of Swaziland from the Apostolic Vicariate of Natal in South Africa 
 March 15, 1939: Promoted as Apostolic Vicariate of Swaziland 
 January 11, 1951: Promoted as Diocese of Bremersdorp 
 November 7, 1961: Renamed as Diocese of Manzini

Leadership

Prefects Apostolic of Swaziland 

Fr. Pellegrino Bellezze, OSM (15 March 1923 – 1932)
Fr. Romualdo Migliorini, OSM (8 July 1933 – 1939)

Vicar Apostolic of Swaziland 

 Costantino Maria Attilio Barneschi, OSM (15 March 1939 – 11 January 1951 see below)

Bishop of Bremersdorp 

 Costantino Maria Attilio Barneschi, OSM (see above 11 January 1951 – 7 November 1961 see below)

Bishops of Manzini 

 Costantino Maria Attilio Barneschi, OSM (see above 7 November 1961 – 21 May 1965)
 Girolamo Maria Casalini, OSM (18 December 1965 – 24 January 1976)
 Aloysius Isaac Mandlenkhosi Zwane (24 January 1976 – 10 August 1980)
 Louis Ncamiso Ndlovu, OSM (1 July 1985 – 27 August 2012)
 José Luís Ponce de León, IMC (29 November 2013 – present)

See also
Catholic Church in South Africa
Catholic Church in Eswatini

References

External links
 GCatholic.org
 Catholic Hierarchy

Roman Catholic dioceses in Eswatini
Christian organizations established in 1923
Roman Catholic dioceses and prelatures established in the 20th century
Manzini, Eswatini
Roman Catholic Ecclesiastical Province of Johannesburg